Beach Dickerson ( – 2005) was an American actor known for such films as The Trip and Crazy Mama.

Early life

Dickerson was born in Glennville, Georgia.

Career
Dickerson worked frequently with director Roger Corman. His first appearance was in Attack of the Crab Monsters.

He also appeared in the films Sorority Girl, Rock All Night, Cocaine and Blue Eyes, Teenage Caveman and the 1991 film Future Kick.

Death
He died in Los Angeles, California, on December 7, 2005, at age 81.

Dickerson willed three houses to his friend, author Scotty Bowers. The spreading of Dickerson's ashes by Bowers was shown in the 2017 documentary film Scotty and the Secret History of Hollywood.

Partial filmography
 1956 Hollywood or Bust as Bellboy (uncredited)
 1957 Attack of the Crab Monsters as Seaman Ron Fellows
 1957 Rock All Night as The Kid
 1957 Loving You as Glenn (uncredited)
 1957 Sorority Girl as Terry's Boyfriend
 1958 War of the Satellites as Crewman With Gun
 1958 Teenage Caveman as Fair-Haired Boy / Man from Burning Plains / Tom-Tom Player / Bear
 1959 T-Bird Gang as Barney Adams
 1960 Visit to a Small Planet as Beatnik (uncredited)
 1960 G.I. Blues as Warren
 1961 Creature from the Haunted Sea as Pete Peterson Jr.
 1964 Shell Shock as Rance
 1967 The Trip
 1968 The Savage Seven as Bruno
 1968 Killers Three as Scotty
 1969 Like Mother Like Daughter as Joe "Jo-Jo"
 1969 The Gun Runner as Max Keeler
 1970 The Dunwich Horror as Mr. Cole
 1970 Angels Die Hard as "Shank"
 1971 Bury Me an Angel as Harry
 1971 Welcome Home, Soldier Boys as Used Car Salesman
 1972 Runaway, Runaway as Bruce, Lorri's Customer
 1973 Cleopatra Jones as Homosexual (uncredited)
 1974 Summer School Teachers as Apartment Manager
 1975 Capone as Joe Kepka
 1975 Crazy Mama as Desk Clerk
 1976 Eat My Dust as G.I. Jackson
 1981 Smokey Bites the Dust as Band Director
 1985 School Spirit as Second Doctor
 1988 Deadly Dreams as Sportsman #2
 1991 Future Kick as Hotel Clerk

References

External links

1924 births
2005 deaths
American male film actors
American male television actors
20th-century American male actors
People from Glennville, Georgia
Male actors from Georgia (U.S. state)